Captain Marvel may refer to:

Comics
 Captain Marvel (DC Comics), several DC characters:
 Billy Batson, the original Captain Marvel, currently called Shazam
 Mary Marvel, called Captain Marvel in The Power of Shazam!
 Captain Marvel Jr., called Captain Marvel in "Titans Tomorrow"
 Captain Marvel (Marvel Comics), several Marvel Comics characters:
 Mar-Vell, the original (Marvel Comics) Captain Marvel
 Mar-Vell (Marvel Cinematic Universe), the Marvel Cinematic Universe adaptation
 Monica Rambeau, also known as Photon, Pulsar, and Spectrum
 Monica Rambeau (Marvel Cinematic Universe), the Marvel Cinematic Universe adaptation
 Genis-Vell, also known as Legacy and Photon
 Phyla-Vell, also known as Quasar and Martyr
 Khn'nr, a Skrull posing as Mar-Vell
 Mahr Vehl, the Ultimate Universe version of Captain Marvel
 Noh-Varr, also known as Marvel Boy and Protector
 Carol Danvers, the current Captain Marvel, formerly known as Ms. Marvel
 Carol Danvers (Marvel Cinematic Universe), the Marvel Cinematic Universe adaptation
 Maria Rambeau, who becomes Captain Marvel in an alternate timeline
 Captain Marvel (Amalgam Comics), an amalgam of the Marvel and DC characters
 Captain Marvel (M. F. Enterprises)

Film
 Adventures of Captain Marvel, a 1941 film serial about the Fawcett Comics character
 Captain Marvel (film), a 2019 film about the Marvel Comics character
 The Marvels (film), an upcoming 2023 film, sequel to the above
 Shazam! (film), a 2019 film set in the DC Extended Universe about the DC Comics character
 Shazam! Fury of the Gods, an upcoming 2023 film, sequel to the above

Music
 "Captain Marvel", a 1972 Chick Corea composition recorded on Light as a Feather, the 1973 Return to Forever album
 Captain Marvel (album), a 1974 album by Stan Getz, with the Corea composition as title track
 Captain Marvel (soundtrack), a soundtrack album from the 2019 film, by Pinar Toprak

Other uses
 "Captain Marvel", nickname of Bryan Robson (born 1957), English football player and manager

See also
 Captain (disambiguation)
 Marvel (disambiguation)
 Marvell (disambiguation)